The Bürgermeister-Müller-Museum is a natural history museum in Solnhofen, Germany. In 1954 the mayor Friedrich Mueller brought his private collection to the public. In 1968 the museum was officially founded and opened in 1970. The museum collection, which extends over two floors, mainly consists of fossils from the Solnhofen Plattenkalk and includes pterosaurs, one of the eleven known specimens of the Jurassic bird Archaeopteryx and an extensive collection of fossil fish. 
Also, there is a department for lithography.

External links

Official Site (German)

Natural history museums in Germany
Museums in Bavaria
Fossil museums
Buildings and structures in Weißenburg-Gunzenhausen